The 2009 Women's Ford National Hockey League was the 11th edition of the women's field hockey tournament in New Zealand. The competition was held in five cities across the country, from 12 to 27 September.

Central won the title for the second time, defeating Midlands 4–3 in the final. North Harbour finished in third place after winning the bronze medal match 2–1 over Auckland.

Participating teams
The following eight teams competed for the title:

 Auckland
 Canterbury
 Central
 Midlands
 Northland
 North Harbour
 Southern
 Wellington

Results

Preliminary round

Fixtures

Classification round

Seventh and eighth place

Fifth and sixth place

Third and fourth place

Final

Statistics

Final standings

Goalscorers

References

External links
Official website

Hockey
Ford National Hockey League
New Zealand National Hockey League seasons
Women's field hockey in New Zealand